Rhopobota bicolor is a species of moth of the family Tortricidae. It is found in China (Hubei, Hunan, Sichuan, Guizhou), Taiwan, Japan and Thailand.

The forewings have a bicolored ground colour, the anterior part is blackish brown and the posterior part
pale greyish brown.

References

Moths described in 1989
Eucosmini